The Ilyushin Il-26 was a late 1940s project for a strategic heavy bomber by the Ilyushin Design Bureau. There were a variety of alternative engines proposed for the Il-26, including the  Shvetsov ASh-2TK piston engine and  Yakovlev M-501 diesel engine. The specifications varied according to the number and type of engines proposed.

Clandestine use in the Soviet Afghan war 
During the Soviet–Afghan War, Soviet & Afghan warplanes would occasionally cross into Pakistani territory while pursuing Afghan Mujahideen forces. Though in early March 1980, PAF Shenyang F-6s of the No. 15 Squadron on Air Defence Alert reported to have intercepted an Il-26 bomber that had intruded into Pakistani airspace however they weren't given clearance to shoot it down and instead escorted it across the Durand Line back into Afghanistan.

Specifications (Il-26 estimated)

References

Further reading
 

Il-0026
1940s Soviet bomber aircraft
Abandoned military aircraft projects of the Soviet Union
Six-engined tractor aircraft
Mid-wing aircraft